The 2010 Nagoya Grampus season is Nagoya Grampus's 18th season in the J.League Division 1 and 29th overall in the Japanese top flight. They also competed in the 2010 J.League Cup, 2010 Emperor's Cup.

Players

Current squad

Transfers

In:

Out:

Competitions

J.League

Results summary

Results by round

Results

League table

J.League Cup

Emperor's Cup

Squad statistics

Appearances and goals

|}Cup appearances to be added

Goal scorers

Disciplinary record

References
2011 J.League Division 1 Fixture

Nagoya Grampus seasons
Nagoya Grampus